Omer Taverne (Binche, 27 July 1904 — Binche, 10 October 1981) was a Belgian professional road bicycle racer, who won two stages in the Tour de France.

Major results

 1929
 Tour de France:
 Winner stage 3
 1930
 Züri-Metzgete
 Tour de France:
 Winner stage 4

External links
 
 Official Tour de France results for Omer Taverne

1904 births
1981 deaths
People from Binche
Belgian male cyclists
Belgian Tour de France stage winners
Cyclists from Hainaut (province)